Kein or KEIN  may refer to:
Kein language, a language of Papua New Guinea
Kein (EP), a 2007 EP by Japanese metal band Unsraw
KEIN, an American radio station

People with the name 
Sybil Kein (born 1939), American poet
Kein Cross, American fashion designer
Kein Einaste (born 1985), Estonian skier

See also 
 Kain (disambiguation)